The 1955 European Judo Championships were the 5th edition of the European Judo Championships, and were held in Paris, France on the 4 December 1955.

Medal winners

References 

European Judo Championships
European Judo Championships
European Judo Championships
Sport in Paris
International sports competitions hosted by France
E